The fourth season of The Good Wife began airing on September 30, 2012. Executive producer Tony Scott died in August 2012, about a month prior to the start of the season, and the premiere was dedicated to him. The season finale aired on April 28, 2013.

Premise

The series focuses on Alicia Florrick, whose husband Peter, the former Cook County, Illinois, state's attorney, has been jailed following a notorious political corruption and sex scandal. After having spent the previous thirteen years as a stay-at-home mother, Alicia returns to the workforce as a litigator to provide for her two children.

Cast

Main
 Julianna Margulies as Alicia Florrick
 Matt Czuchry as Cary Agos
 Archie Panjabi as Kalinda Sharma
 Makenzie Vega as Grace Florrick
 Graham Phillips as Zach Florrick
 Alan Cumming as Eli Gold
 Josh Charles as Will Gardner
 Christine Baranski as Diane Lockhart

Recurring
 Chris Noth as Peter Florrick
 Nathan Lane as Clarke Hayden
 Zach Grenier as David Lee
 Marc Warren as Nick Savarese
 Maura Tierney as Maddie Hayward
 Amanda Peet as Captain Laura Hellinger
 T.R. Knight as Jordan Karahalios
 Jess Weixler as Robyn Burdine
 Mary Beth Peil as Jackie Florrick
 Renée Elise Goldsberry as Geneva Pine
 Skipp Sudduth as Jim Moody
 Carrie Preston as Elsbeth Tascioni
 Stockard Channing as Veronica Loy
 Miriam Shor as Mandy Post
 Mike Colter as Lemond Bishop
 Dallas Roberts as Owen Cavanaugh
 Denis O'Hare as Judge Charles Abernathy
 Dylan Baker as Colin Sweeney
 Mike Pniewski as Frank Landau
 John Benjamin Hickey as Neil Gross
 Kristin Chenoweth as Peggy Byrne
 Jill Flint as Lana Delaney
 Michael J. Fox as Louis Canning
 Matthew Perry as Mike Kresteva
 Kyle MacLachlan as Josh Perotti

Guest
 Chris Butler as Matan Brody
 Gary Cole as Kurt McVeigh
 Martha Plimpton as Patti Nyholm
 Mamie Gummer as Nancy Crozier
 Ana Gasteyer as Judge Patrice Lessner
 Anika Noni Rose as Wendy Scott-Carr
 Rita Wilson as Viola Walsh
 Kurt Fuller as Judge Peter Dunaway
 Wallace Shawn as Charles Lester

Episodes

Reception

The fourth season of The Good Wife received critical acclaim. The review aggregator website Rotten Tomatoes reports a 95% certified fresh rating based on 21 reviews. The critics consensus reads, "This season of The Good Wife continues its winning streak as one of television's top shows, with unique legal cases and intelligent political drama." On Metacritic, the fourth season currently sits at an 86 out of 100, based on 5 critics, indicating "universal acclaim".

Awards and nominations

Primetime Emmy Awards
Nomination for Outstanding Supporting Actress in a Drama Series in a Drama Series (Christine Baranski for "The Seven Day Rule")
Nomination for Outstanding Guest Actor in a Drama Series (Michael J. Fox for "Boom De Yah Da")
Nomination for Outstanding Guest Actor in a Drama Series (Nathan Lane for "I Fought the Law")
Won for Outstanding Guest Actress in a Drama Series (Carrie Preston for "Je Ne Sais What?")
Nomination for Outstanding Casting for a Drama Series (Mark Saks)

U.S. Nielsen ratings

References 

2012 American television seasons
2013 American television seasons
4